Gustavo Kuerten and Antonio Prieto were the defending champions but only Prieto competed that year with Álex Calatrava.

Calatrava and Prieto lost in the first round to Sergio Roitman and Andrés Schneiter.

Lucas Arnold and Tomás Carbonell won in the final 6–4, 2–6, 6–3 against Mariano Hood and Sebastián Prieto.

Seeds

  Simon Aspelin /  Martín García (quarterfinals)
  Lucas Arnold /  Tomás Carbonell (champions)
  Cristian Brandi /  Daniel Orsanic (first round)
  Álex López Morón /  Albert Portas (first round)

Draw

References
 2001 Chevrolet Cup Doubles Draw

2001 Doubles
2001 ATP Tour